The fourth and final quarter is due to air this quarter with the last defending champion of Quarter III will return for Quarter IV.

Daily rounds 
Color Key:

Contender's Information:

Color Key:

Contender's Information:

Results Details:

 Italicized names denotes as contender is a resbaker
 DW denotes contender as the daily winner
 DC denotes contender as the defending champion

 

 *due to the semi-finals, Rica Mae Maer (Luzon) will proceed to the fourth season.

Semifinals 
The semifinals will take place at the end of the third quarter which will determine the two grand finalists that will take place in 2019. The two grand finalists will receive a medal and an additional 150,000 cash, while the remaining contenders will receive additional 25,000. The score will be composed of 50% coming from the judges and 50% from the text and/or online votes. A semi-finalist may be "gonged" during this stage and be eliminated from the competition.

Summary of semifinalists

Semifinal results 
The fourth and final quarter of the contest covered the months originally from April to June later from April to August. The week-long showdown originally took place on June 24–29, 2019 later reschedule on August 26–31, 2019.

Color Key:

Violeta Bayawa (Mindanao) and Julius Cawaling (Luzon) were announced as the 7th and 8th grand finalists.

References
Notes

Scores

Sources

External links
 Tawag ng Tanghalan

Tawag ng Tanghalan seasons
2019 Philippine television seasons